Mission: Impossible 2 – Music from the Original Motion Picture Score is an original score album by Hans Zimmer for the 2000 film Mission: Impossible 2. Lisa Gerrard provided contralto vocal cues for certain tracks in her second collaboration with Hans Zimmer in the same year along with Gladiator.

Track listing

Personnel
Klaus Badelt
Michael Brook
Lisa Gerrard
Dave Gamson
Nick Glennie-Smith
Oliver Leiber
Heitor Pereira
Jeff Rona
Martin Tillman
Mel Wesson
Hans Zimmer

References

Hans Zimmer soundtracks
2000 soundtrack albums
2000s film soundtrack albums
Mission: Impossible music
Hollywood Records soundtracks
Mission: Impossible (film series)